Gopinagar is a village located in the West Tripura District, Tripura, India. The population is 6,984. 3,583 people are male. 3,381 are female.

References

Villages in West Tripura district